Gomorrah or Gomorra may refer to:
 Sodom and Gomorrah, Biblical cities
 Gomorrah (book), a 2006 non-fiction investigative book by Roberto Saviano
 Gomorrah (film), based on the book
 Gomorrah (TV series), based on the book
 Operation Gomorrah, the Bombing of Hamburg in World War II in July 1943
 Liber Gomorrhianus or Book of Gomorrah, a book written by Peter Damian
 Gomorra (EP), a 1994 EP by Wumpscut
 Gomorrah, a fictional casino within the video game Fallout: New Vegas

See also
Sodom and Gomorrah (disambiguation)
Gomora (disambiguation)